Alexandra Davis DiPentima (born April 18, 1953) is a former Judge and  Chief Judge of the Connecticut Appellate Court.

Early life and education
DiPentima graduated from Kent School in Kent, Connecticut in 1971. She earned a Bachelor of Arts in intellectual property from Princeton University in 1975 and her Juris Doctor from University of Connecticut School of Law in 1979. She was admitted into the Connecticut bar in 1979, United States District Court in 1980, the United States Court of Appeals in 1983 and the United States Supreme Court Bar in 1987.

From 1979 until 1981 she worked with Connecticut Legal Services dealing with low income domestic and property issues. She then joined the firm of Moller, Horton & Fineberg, P.C. In 1993, she was appointed to the superior court. She assumed senior status on July 31, 2020.

References

1953 births
Living people
20th-century American judges
20th-century American lawyers
21st-century American judges
Judges of the Connecticut Appellate Court
Kent School alumni
Princeton University alumni
University of Connecticut School of Law alumni
20th-century American women lawyers
20th-century American women judges
21st-century American women judges